Alan Mackay may refer to:

Alan Lindsay Mackay (born 1926), British crystallographer
Alan Mackay (reporter), Scottish television news reporter for the BBC
Alan Mackay (footballer) (born 1943), Scottish footballer for Third Lanark, Motherwell, Dumbarton

See also
Allan McKay (visual effects) (born 1982), visual effects supervisor